Tuti District is one of twenty districts of the province Caylloma in Peru.

Geography 
The Ch'ila mountain range traverses the district. Other mountains are listed below:

Ethnic groups 
The people in the district are mainly indigenous citizens of Quechua descent. Quechua is the language which the majority of the population (59.95%) learnt to speak in childhood, 39.93% of the residents started speaking using the Spanish language (2007 Peru Census).

References

Districts of the Caylloma Province
Districts of the Arequipa Region